Thecodontosauridae is a family of basal sauropodomorph dinosaurs that are part of the Bagualosauria, known from fossil remains found exclusively in the Magnesian Conglomerate of Bristol, England, which dates back to the Rhaetian stage of the Late Triassic (although it could be as old as the Norian stage of the Late Triassic and as young as the Hettangian stage of the Early Jurassic). Two genera are known: Agrosaurus and Thecodontosaurus;  the former is often considered to be the same animal as the latter.

References

Sauropodomorphs
Norian first appearances
Late Triassic extinctions
Prehistoric dinosaur families